E Percy Fowle served as the Chief Scout of the Boy Scouts of South Africa from 1953 to 1958. In 1954 he was promoted to Commander (Brother) of the Order of Saint John. He led the South African contingent to the 9th World Scout Jamboree in England in 1958 for the 50th anniversary of Scouting.

References

External links

Year of birth missing
Scouting and Guiding in South Africa